When the Cossacks Weep is a 1963 Soviet short film directed by Yevgeny Morgunov.

Plot 
The film takes place in 1926 on the Don. A group of Cossacks went for a walk, and when they returned, they found that their families had disappeared somewhere.

Cast 
 Nikolay Gorlov
 Irina Murzayeva as Praskovya
 Georgiy Svetlani as Sashko
 Emma Tsesarskaya
 Zoya Vasilkova
 Tatyana Zabrodina

References

External links 
 

1963 films
1960s Russian-language films
Soviet short films
1963 short films